Zorigtyn Batkhuyag (also Batkhuyag Zorigt, ; born March 19, 1974, in Ulaanbaatar) is a Mongolian sport shooter. Zorigt made her official debut for the 2000 Summer Olympics in Sydney, where she placed twentieth in the 10 m air rifle, and twenty-third in the 50 m rifle 3 positions, with total scores of 391 and 572 points, respectively.

Eight years after competing in her first Olympics, Zorigt qualified for her second Mongolian team, as a 34-year-old, at the 2008 Summer Olympics in Beijing, by finishing third in the air rifle from the 2006 ISSF World Cup series in Guangzhou, China. She placed twenty-second in the women's 10 m air rifle by one point behind Finland's Hanna Etula from the final attempt, with a total score of 394 points. Nearly a week later, Zorigt competed for her second event, 50 m rifle 3 positions, where she was able to shoot 194 targets in a prone position, 181 in standing, and 195 in kneeling, for a total score of 570 points, finishing only in thirty-third place.

References

External links
 
 NBC 2008 Olympics profile
 

1974 births
Living people
Mongolian female sport shooters
Olympic shooters of Mongolia
Shooters at the 2000 Summer Olympics
Shooters at the 2008 Summer Olympics
Sportspeople from Ulaanbaatar
Shooters at the 2002 Asian Games
Shooters at the 2006 Asian Games
Shooters at the 2010 Asian Games
Asian Games competitors for Mongolia
20th-century Mongolian women
21st-century Mongolian women